is a town located in Shiribeshi Subprefecture, Hokkaido, Japan.

As of September 2016, the town has an estimated population of 3,113, and a density of 33 persons per km². The total area is 95.36 km².

Geography
The town of Suttsu faces the Suttsu Bay, a bay of the Sea of Japan. Shubetsu River flows in the middle of the town and divides the town into east and west.

Neighboring towns and village
 Kuromatsunai
 Rankoshi
 Shimamaki

Climate
Suttsu has a humid continental climate (Köppen climate classification Dfb) with warm summers and cold winters. Precipitation is significant throughout the year, but the months from March to June are somewhat drier.

History
1897: Suttsu Subprefecture was established.
1900: Suttsu Town was founded and became a First Class Town.
1902: Isoya Village (Isoya District) was founded and became a Second Class Village.
1906: Utasutsu Village (Utasutsu District) was founded and became a Second Class Village.
1910: Suttsu Subprefecture was abolished and Shiribeshi Subprefecture was established in Kutchan.
1923: Masadomari Village and Tarukishi Village became Second Class Villages.
1933: Suttsu Town and Masadomari Village were merged to form the new town of Suttsu.
1955: Suttsu Town, Isoya Village, Utasutsu Village, and a part of Tarukishi Village were merged to form the new town of Suttsu.

Industry
Fisheries comprise the main economic activity of Suttsu. The town developed by the fishery of herring. Because of a decrease of fishery resources, Suttsu focuses on an aquaculture business now.

Education
 High school
 Hokkaido Suttsu High School
 Junior high school
 Suttsu Junior High School
 Elementary school
 Suttsu Elementary School
 Oshoro Elementary School

References

External links

Official Website 

Towns in Hokkaido